Albert Samuel Gatschet (October 3, 1832, Beatenberg, Canton of Bern – March 16, 1907, Washington, D.C.) was a Swiss-American ethnologist who trained as a linguist in the universities of Bern and Berlin. He later moved to the United States and settled there in order to study Native American languages, a field in which he was a pioneer.

In 1877 he became an ethnologist with the US Geological Survey. In 1879 he became a member of the Bureau of American Ethnology, which was part of the Smithsonian Institution. In 1884, he was elected as a member to the American Philosophical Society.

Gatschet published his observations of the Karankawa people of Texas. His study of the Klamath people located in present-day Oregon, published in 1890, is recognized as outstanding. In 1902 Gatschet was elected as a member of the American Antiquarian Society, whose members were studying ancient and historic peoples.

Works

References

External links

 
 

1832 births
1907 deaths
People from Interlaken-Oberhasli District
Swiss ethnologists
Linguists from Switzerland
Linguists of Algic languages
Linguists of Klamath
Linguists of Karankawa
Linguists of Timucua
Members of the American Antiquarian Society
Members of the American Philosophical Society
Linguists from the United States